Marcel Millet (30 May 1886, Cannes – 20 January 1970, Juvisy-sur-Orge) was a French novelist, poet and actor, who was also a libertarian activist.

In May 1922 he attended the International Congress of Progressive Artists and signed the "Founding Proclamation of the Union of Progressive International Artists".

Acting career
He appeared in the 1941 film Vénus aveugle directed by Abel Gance. and the 1942 film Men Without Fear (French: Les hommes sans peur), directed by Yvan Noé.

References

1886 births
1970 deaths